Srivilliputtur railway station is a railway station in the town of Srivilliputhur, Virudhunagar district in Tamil Nadu.

Jurisdiction
It belongs to the Madurai railway division of the Southern Railway zone of Virudhunagar district in Tamil Nadu. The station code is SVPR.

Line
This railway station is situated about 5 kms to the east of the town. The next railway station on the south is Rajapalayam.

Notable places nearby
 Grizzled Squirrel Wildlife Sanctuary
 Sathuragiri Hills
 Sri Vaidyanathar Temple
 Arulmigu Sundaramahalinga Swamy Temple

References

https://www.newindianexpress.com/opinions/2012/apr/25/the-saga-of-a-lonely-railway-station-362093.html

Railway stations in Virudhunagar district
Madurai railway division

7. https://www.newindianexpress.com/opinions/2012/apr/25/the-saga-of-a-lonely-railway-station-362093.html